Harris is an unincorporated community in Benton County, Oregon, United States.  Harris lies on U.S. Route 20 just south of its interchange with Oregon Route 223 in Wren.

Unincorporated communities in Benton County, Oregon
Unincorporated communities in Oregon